This article lists political parties in Malta. 
Since World War II, Maltese political culture has developed into a two-party system dominated by the centre-left Labour Party and the centre-right Nationalist Party. Although other political parties have presented candidates and, in some cases, elected MPs, in most cases these were splinter groups of the main parties and, on the rare occasions when they were successful, this success was short-lived.

In the case of Local Councils however, independent candidates and village-dedicated parties have better chances of being elected. For example, Għarb l-Ewwel (en: Għarb First) is the only party of this kind to yet hold representation in a Local Council. There are two elected independent councillors, one in Ħaż-Żebbuġ (Malta) and the other in Żebbuġ (Gozo).

Active political parties

Until 2015, there was no law in Malta requiring the registration and regulation of political parties, the General Elections Act made the necessary provisions for party participation in elections but no official list was maintained between elections. The Financing of Political Parties Act, which passed in 2015 and came into effect on 1 January 2016, introduced the requirement for political parties to register themselves with the Electoral Commission and declare all donations in order to be able to field candidates in general elections and European Parliament elections. The Labour Party was the first party to attempt to register, on 3 June 2016, however its statute was not compliant, therefore making Moviment Patrijotti Maltin the first party to be officially registered, on 24 November 2016. The Labour Party was finally registered on 22 April 2017.

Parties represented both in Parliament, Local Councils and Administrative Committees

Parties represented only in Local Councils

Non-parliamentary parties

Inactive, local and unrepresented political parties 

 Moviment Patrijotti Maltin
 Partit Ajkla (Eagle Party)
 Floriana l-Ewwel (Floriana First)

Defunct parties 

 Alleanza Bidla
 Alleanza Nazzjonali Repubblikana
 Alliance of Liberal Democrats Malta
 Alpha Liberal Democratic Party
 Anti-Reform Party
 Christian Workers' Party (active during 1960's Church/PL conflict)
 Constitutional Party
 Democratic Alternative
 Democratic Action Party
 Democratic Nationalist Party (1921–26)
 Democratic Nationalist Party (1959-66)
 Democratic Party
 Gozo Party
 Jones Party
 Independent Labour Party
 Integrity Party (Malta)
 Libertas Malta
 Malta Workers Party
 Maltese Political Union
 National Action (Azzjoni Nazzjonali)
 Progressive Constitutionalist Party
 Brain, not ego

See also
 Politics of Malta
 List of political parties by country

References

Malta
 
Political parties
Political parties
Malta